Ioanna Stamatopoulou  (born 17 June 1998) is a Greek water polo player, playing as a goalkeeper for Olympiacos and the Greece women's national team. As a player of Olympiacos, she won the 2014–15 LEN Euro League Women, the 2015 Women's LEN Super Cup and the 2014 Women's LEN Trophy. She was part of the Greece women's national water polo team that won the silver medal at the 2018 European Championship in Barcelona and the bronze medal at the 2015 European Games in Baku. She started competing water polo in 2009 with the team of Ethnikos Piraeus before moving to Olympiacos in 2012.

References

External links
 at Baku 2015

1998 births
Living people
Greek female water polo players
Olympiacos Women's Water Polo Team players
Water polo players from Athens
Water polo players at the 2015 European Games
European Games bronze medalists for Greece
European Games medalists in water polo
21st-century Greek women

Ethnikos Piraeus Water Polo Club players